Ramaleela is a 2017 Indian Malayalam-language political thriller film  written by Sachy and directed by debutant Arun Gopy. It stars Dileep, Raadhika, Prayaga Martin, Mukesh, Kalabhavan Shajon, Vijayaraghavan and Siddique. The film is produced and distributed by Tomichan Mulakuppadam under Mulakuppadam Films. Ramaleela was released in India on 28 September 2017.

Plot
Advocate Ramanunni is an MLA of Ayikkara in Palakkad District  who gets expelled from his political communist party, the CDP for assaulting the District Secretary Ambadi Mohanan  and joins the rival secularist party, the NSP. Ramanunni, who has been receiving threats from CDP activists, decides to take a gun license for self-protection and this becomes a controversy in the news. Ramanunni's mother Ragini disapproves of his decision to join the NSP as they come from a communist-oriented family and his father Raghavan, a CDP activist who is believed to have been martyred by NSP activists. The NSP decides to appoint Ramanunni as their candidate in the upcoming election. 

The decision is opposed by Udayabhanu, a veteran politician of the NSP but this is overlooked by the others. Ramanunni, along with his sidekick Thomas Chacko, the NSP Youth Wing Secretary, attend an interview where Mohanan assaults Ramanunni. As the promotions for the elections begin, the CDP announces their candidate as Ragini, who they think is the only person who can defeat Ramanunni. While campaigning at a football match, Mohanan is shot dead and Ramanunni and Chacko become the prime suspects. The Investigation Officer, Paulson Devassy, who is also present at the assassination point, finds out that Ramanunni's gun is missing a bullet. Ballistics match the bullet that killed Mohanan with the bullets in Ramanunni's gun, and shows that the gun must have been fired from the row where Ramanunni and Chacko were sitting. 

Ramanunni and Chacko escape police custody and hide in the house of V.G. Madhavan, a journalist and a good friend of Ramanunni. Madhavan's daughter Helena  decides to help them. Now in disguise, they leave for a resort on an island off the coast of Goa. Unknown to Ramanunni and Chacko, Helena televises all their actions through hidden cameras under the name of 'Hot Pursuit' in order to find the real culprit. With Ramanunni gone, the NSP appoints Sumesh Venjara, a disliked and weak politician as their new candidate. In Goa, Ramanunni reveals that it was Ambadi Mohanan and Udayabhanu who were behind his father's death and not the NSP activists. 

As the videos get televised, Officer Paulson Devassy gathers evidence of Mohanan's death that leads to Udayabhanu; especially a can of Red Bull that was used as a suppressor since Udayabhanu was very fond of the drink. Police later arrests him. It is revealed that televising Ramanunni's escape was his and Helena's plan to prove his innocence. Ramanunni goes on to win the election as an independent candidate. In a major twist, it turns out that it was actually Ramanunni who had assassinated Ambadi Mohanan with the help of a fellow CDP comrade Chandran. He accused Udayabhanu because of his role in his father's death. He explains to his mother that it was his duty to remove all obstacles from the CDP's path. His mother salutes Ramanunni, and he does the same back.

Cast

 Dileep as Adv. K.R. Ramanunni MLA
Mukesh  as Dysp Paulson Devassy
 Raadhika Sarathkumar as Ragini Raghavan, Ramanunni's mother
 Prayaga Martin as Helena Madhavan
 Kalabhavan Shajohn as Thomas Chacko
 Siddique as Udayabhanu
 Vijayaraghavan as Ambadi Mohanan
 Suresh Krishna as Theekuni Chandran
 Renji Panicker as V.G. Madhavan
 Lena as TV reporter Olga John
 Ashokan as IG Balachandran IPS
 Saikumar as Sakhavu P. Sugathan
 G. Suresh Kumar as Sagar Nagambadam
 Sadiq as Saghavu Rajendran
 Kalabhavan Shaju as Prakashan
 Anil Murali as Sudhi
 Ameer Niyas as CI Deepak
 Salim Kumar as Sumesh Venjara
 Prasanth Alexander
 Sreejith Ravi as Trainer Siby Chacko
 Chali Pala as SI Soman
 Manju Satheesh as a CDP Member
 Tomichan Mulakuppadam as Himself (Cameo Appearance)
 Romin Anthony as Ajay
 Abhishek Raveendran
 Diya Parveen as Journalist
 Murali as Sakhavu Raghavan (Photo Archive)
Vinod Kedamangalam as Driver Pushpan

Production
The film is produced and distributed by Tomichan Mulakuppadam under the production company Mulakuppadam Films. It was made with a budget of 14 crore. Gopi Sundar composed the music. Through Ramaleela, Raadhika returned to act in Malayalam cinema after a gap of 23 years. Principal photography began on 9 December 2016 in Kochi, Kerala. Filming also held at Palakkad, Thiruvananthapuram, and in Maldives .

Release
Ramaleela release was delayed on account of actor Dileep's arrest for conspiracy to kidnap and attempt to rape of actress Bhavana. Despite calls for a boycott, the film released in India on 28 September 2017. It released across 129 screens in Kerala.

Box office
The film collected 55 crore at the box office.

Soundtrack
Music: Gopi Sundar, Lyrics: B. K. Harinarayanan

References

External links
 

2017 films
2010s Malayalam-language films
Indian romantic comedy films
Indian political thriller films
Films shot in Goa
Films shot in Maharashtra
Films shot in Palakkad
Films shot in Thiruvananthapuram
Films scored by Gopi Sundar